Pennsylvania State Senate District 39 includes part of Westmoreland County. It is currently represented by Republican Kim Ward.

District profile
The district includes the following areas:

Senators

References

Government of Westmoreland County, Pennsylvania
Pennsylvania Senate districts